National library of the United States may refer to:

 Library of Congress (LOC)
 United States National Agricultural Library (NAL)
 National Library of Education (United States) (NLE)
 United States National Library of Medicine (NLM)
 National Transportation Library (NTL)

See also
 National library